The Water (Scotland) Act 1967 (1967 c.78) is an Act of the Parliament of the United Kingdom that reorganised the water supply industry in Scotland, by creating Regional Water Boards to manage the treatment and supply of water to consumers, and a Central Scotland Water Development Board, which was responsible for developing new sources of water, and supplying that water to the Regional Water Boards in bulk.

Background
In 1945, there were 210 separate water authorities in Scotland, and no statutory requirement that communities should be supplied with a drinkable water supply. This changed when the Water (Scotland) Act 1946 was passed by the UK Government, which mandated local authorities to provide such a supply.

Legislation
The 1967 Act was the first major attempt to consolidate the large numbers of small water authorities into larger units. 13 Regional Water Boards were created, which were independent of the local government structures, although the members of the Board were always drawn from the local authorities which they served. They were responsible for water supply only, and the disposal and treatment of sewage would remain fragmented for some years yet. On a technical level, the new structures worked well, but their finance had not been thought through, and were less than satisfactory. Central government controlled the finances through local government. The Scottish Office was responsible for supervising the new boards, but the setting of tariffs and charges was still handled by local authorities.

The Act also recognised that, as requirements for water continued to increase, even Regional Water Boards would struggle to finance the provision of new sources of water, and so the Central Scotland Water Development Board was set up, with a mandate to develop new sources of supply, and to sell such water to the Boards within their area. This included the Water Boards for Borders, Central, Fife, Strathclyde, Tayside, and Lothian which included Edinburgh, and accounted for 86 per cent of the Scottish population.

With the passing of the Local Government (Scotland) Act 1973, larger regions were created, and responsibility for water supply passed from the Regional Water Boards to the nine regional councils of Highland, Grampian, Tayside, Fife, Lothian, Borders, Central, Strathclyde, and Dumfries and Galloway. A tenth Island Area included Shetland, Orkney and the Western Isles, although they continued to act independently. The regional councils were also given responsibility for sewage treatment, which prior to that time had been handled by 234 separate organisations. The 1967 Act remained in force until it was repealed from 1 April 1996, as a result of the passing of the Local Government etc. (Scotland) Act 1994.

Boards
A total of 13 Regional Water Boards were created, taking over responsibility for water supply from existing county councils, town councils, corporations, district water boards, and joint water committees. The boards were as follows.

Joint Water Boards were a result of the Water Act 1945. This had encouraged the amalgamation of the water supply works from adjacent local authorities, so that water supply could be improved. Each board consisted of members appointed by local councils, who had expert knowledge of engineering or finance.

Bibliography

References

United Kingdom Acts of Parliament 1967
Water in the United Kingdom
Acts of the Parliament of the United Kingdom concerning Scotland
1967 in Scotland
Water supply and sanitation in Scotland